Karuchi may refer to:
 Karuchi, Khash
 Karuchi, Nik Shahr